Daniel Boulud (born 25 March 1955 in Saint-Pierre-de-Chandieu) is a French chef and restaurateur with restaurants in New York City, Palm Beach, Miami, Toronto, Montréal, Singapore, the Bahamas, the Berkshires and Dubai. He is best known for his eponymous restaurant Daniel, in New York City, which currently holds two Michelin stars.

Boulud was raised on a farm near Lyon and trained by several French chefs. Boulud built a reputation in New York, initially as a chef and more recently as a restaurateur. His management company, The Dinex Group, currently includes fifteen restaurants, three locations of a gourmet cafe (Epicerie Boulud), and Feast & Fêtes Catering. His restaurants include Daniel, Le Pavillon, Le Gratin, Café Boulud, Maison Boulud, Joji, and Joji Box, db bistro, Bar Boulud, and Boulud Sud.

Culinary background
At fifteen, Boulud earned his first professional recognition as a finalist in France's competition for Best Culinary Apprentice. Boulud worked in France with Roger Vergé, Georges Blanc and Michel Guérard and later in Copenhagen before becoming the private chef to the European Commission in Washington, D.C.

After moving to New York City, Boulud opened the Polo Lounge at The Westbury Hotel, followed by Le Régence at the Hotel Plaza Athenée. From 1986 to 1992, he was the critically acclaimed executive chef at Le Cirque.

Restaurants
Boulud opened Daniel in Manhattan's Upper East Side in 1993 before relocating the restaurant to a Venetian renaissance-inspired setting at Park Avenue and 65th Street in 1998. The original Daniel was re-launched as Café Boulud. He followed these openings by founding a more casual restaurant in Manhattan's theater district in 2001 and a second Café Boulud in Palm Beach, Florida, in 2003. Daniel Boulud Brasserie opened in 2005 inside the Wynn Las Vegas, three years before Bar Boulud, a French bistro opposite New York City's Lincoln Center, was opened in January 2008, the same year he opened Boulud à Pékin in Beijing.

In 2003, Boulud was announced as the executive chef for the newly launched Cunard liner .

In December 2008, after the departure of founding chef Rob Feenie, Boulud reopened Vancouver restaurants Lumière and Feenie's (renaming the latter "db Bistro Moderne," making it the sister restaurant to db Bistro Moderne in Manhattan). Boulud became the chef, consulting chef, and co-partner. The two restaurants were closed on 13 March 2011, two years after opening DBGB Kitchen & Bar, a Pan-European brasserie, in New York City. In 2009, Boulud also announced that he was looking to start his next venture in London. Bar Boulud London opened on May 29, 2010, inside the Mandarin Oriental Hotel on Knightsbridge, becoming the first Boulud's restaurant in Europe.

Daniel Boulud Brasserie closed on 4 July 2010, when Wynn chose not to renew the contract between Boulud & The Resort (see Wynn Las Vegas for more). In 2013, it was confirmed that the restaurant would re-open at The Venetian Hotel in Las Vegas in the Spring of 2014.

2011 saw many new Boulud openings, including a db Bistro Moderne at Marina Bay Sands in Singapore, a Maison Boulud in Ritz-Carlton Montreal, as well as Boulud Sud next to Bar Boulud, and Épicerie Boulud, a market/deli. In the following year, d|bar opened in the Four Seasons Hotel Toronto, while Bar Boulud Boston opened on 16 September 2014 inside the Mandarin Oriental Hotel Boston. The third location of Epicerie Boulud opened in the Oculus World Trade Center in November 2016.

Around 2018, Boulud collaborated with a group of MIT entrepreneurs to create Spyce Kitchen, a robotic restaurant in Boston. He was responsible for the menu while the founders developed the technology. The restaurant serves bowl-based meals using healthy ingredients like grains, beans, and kale. The restaurant announced its closure on its Facebook page on 18th October 2021.

Boulud opened Le Pavillon, a restaurant in the One Vanderbilt skyscraper in Midtown Manhattan, in May 2021.

Awards
Both Boulud and his restaurants have received several awards. Daniel has been rated one of the top ten restaurants in the world by the International Herald Tribune, received Gourmet's Top Table Award, a four-star rating from The New York Times, Wine Spectator's Grand Award, and New York City's top ratings for cuisine, service, and decor in the Zagat Survey. The flagship New York City restaurant was awarded three Michelin stars in the 2010 Michelin, the book's highest rating. As of August 28, 2012, he had 4 Michelin Stars in total and in January 2013, Daniel NYC was inducted into Culinary Hall of Fame. The restaurant, however, lost its third Michelin star in 2015 for "a lack of consistency".

Boulud himself has been named Chef of the Year by Bon Appétit, and received the James Beard Award for Best Chef of New York City in 1992 while Executive Chef at Le Cirque. The James Beard Foundation also recognized him as "Outstanding Chef of the Year" in 1994 and "Outstanding Restaurateur" in 2006 for restaurant Daniel. In April 2007, he received the Culinary Humanitarian Award at the United Nations from the Adopt-a-Mine Field Foundation. The President of France made Boulud a Chevalier de la Légion d'honneur in March 2006 in recognition of his contribution to the advancement of French culture. Boulud also won the International Outstanding Achievement Award at the 2015 The Catey Awards.

Television

Boulud previously hosted After Hours with Daniel Boulud, a behind-closed-doors look at the late-night dinners by chefs and for chefs. The series revealed where chefs go to unwind after service and uncovered the foods they enjoy and cook for each other. The first season was filmed in New York City restaurants, and the second, on the West Coast, in Los Angeles restaurants. The third season of the show featured restaurants in the New Orleans and Miami culinary scene.

Boulud has also been a featured chef on Great Chefs television, and appeared in the second-season finale of the Canadian television program Anna & Kristina's Grocery Bag, where his cookbook Chef Daniel Boulud: Cooking in New York City was being tested. Boulud appeared as the guest judge along with chefs from his restaurants located in Vancouver: Stephane Istel, executive chef at DB Bistro Moderne, and Dale MacKay, executive chef at Lumière. Boulud's cookbook received the "A & K Stamp of Approval" at the end of the episode.

Boulud appeared as a guest judge in Seasons 1 and 3 of Top Chef Canada.

Boulud appeared as himself in the television drama series Billions, episode "Flaw in the Death Star," season 3.

Community involvement

Boulud works to support several charities, focusing his efforts on hunger relief and culinary education. He has been the board Co-President of Citymeals-on-Wheels since 2003 and hosts an annual gala for the charity each spring. This non-profit organization provides home-delivered, nutritious meals to frail, homebound elderly in New York City. On 13 April 2008, Boulud hosted an intimate Sunday supper to mark the 10th anniversary of Savoring Citymeals, an annual gourmet event he has hosted since 1998.

The Daniel Boulud Scholarship Endowment Fund was established by the chef's business partner, Joel Smilow, in 2005. The fund provides education enabling promising young American cooks to pursue professional culinary studies in France.

In 2008, Paul Bocuse asked Boulud to establish a structure for the selection of the Bocuse d'Or Team USA, who, along with Thomas Keller and Jérôme Bocuse form the Board of Directors of the Bocuse d'Or USA Foundation. The first Bocuse d'Or USA competition was held in September 2008.

Legal issues
	
According to a 2007 article in the Dining Section of The New York Times, Boulud was sued by current and former workers for discriminatory labor practices at his namesake restaurant in Manhattan. The workers alleged that Boulud denied them promotions at his restaurant Daniel because of their race and ethnicity and retaliated against some who complained about it. The federal Equal Employment Opportunity Commission filed suit, and there was an investigation by the Civil Rights Bureau of the New York state Attorney General’s office. Boulud settled with the workers, seven current and former employees of Latin American and Bangladeshi descent, for $80,000 and agreed to set up standards and procedures for promotions to be overseen by the EEOC and the state attorney general's office.

Books
 Cooking with Daniel Boulud (1993)
 Daniel Boulud’s Café Boulud Cookbook (1999)
 In 2001, Boulud allowed author Leslie Brenner near unlimited access to Daniel the result was the 2002 book The Fourth Star: Dispatches from Inside Daniel Boulud's Celebrated New York Restaurant which gives some insight into the workings of the chef and how he operates.
 Daniel Boulud Cooking in New York City (2002)
 Daniel’s Dish, Entertaining at Home with a Four Star Chef (2003)
 Letters to a Young Chef (2003)
 Braise: A Journey Through International Cuisine (2006)
 Daniel – My French Cuisine by Daniel Boulud (Author), Sylvie Bigar (Author), Thomas Schauer (Photographer), Bill Buford (Contributor) (2013)

References

Further reading
 Feast & Fetes covered in New York Parties - Private Views by Jamee Gregory - Nov 2010

External links
 
 Superstar New York Chef Joins Vancouver's Lumiere
 Interview with Chef Boulud and Video of Restaurant
 New York Times Article on EEOC findings Aug. 1, 2007

1955 births
Living people
People from Rhône (department)
French chefs
French cuisine
Head chefs of Michelin starred restaurants
French restaurateurs
James Beard Foundation Award winners